Korean new religions are new religious movements established in Korea. In Korean, they are called shinheung jonggyo ("new religions" 新興宗教). Most of these religious sects started during the late period of the Joseon Dynasty (including the Korean Empire days), when there was lot of political and social turbulence.

Background for creation
The Joseon dynasty publicly applied Neo-Confucian principles in everyday life, however this was very far from what the public believed due to the rejection of concept of spirits in Korean Neo Confucianism. The fall of traditional hierarchies in the late 19th century exacerbated the need of the public for a new religion. The religions flourished during the farmer riots of the 19th century. A new surge of believers occurred during the Korean War in the 1950s  From the 1970s onward, the focus of Korean religious movements shifted from rural areas to urban regions, which the Unification movement being considered an exemplar of this change of trends in new religious movements.

List

References

External link
Korean New Religious Movements: An Introduction Lukas Pokorny
New religious movements
Religion in Korea
Korean new religions